Joely Fisher (/ˈdʒoʊli/ born October 29, 1967) is an American actress and singer, the daughter of singer Eddie Fisher and actress Connie Stevens, and half-sister of actress Carrie Fisher. Her breakthrough came in 1994, starring as Paige Clark in the ABC sitcom Ellen, for which she received a Golden Globe Award nomination. Fisher later starred in the 1999 comedy film Inspector Gadget and had leading roles in the Lifetime comedy-drama Wild Card (2003–2005), and Fox sitcom 'Til Death (2006–2010).

The national members of the trade union SAG-AFTRA elected Fisher as secretary-treasurer on September 2, 2021.

Early life 
Fisher was born on October 29, 1967, in Burbank, California, one of two children born to Edwin "Eddie" Fisher and Connie Stevens (née Concetta Ingolia), both entertainers. Her father was Jewish, whose parents immigrated to the United States from the Russian Empire, whereas her mother was a Catholic and of Ashkenazi Jewish, Irish, and Italian descent. Her parents' second child together was Tricia Leigh Fisher, and her parents divorced in 1969, after which she and Tricia were raised by Stevens. She also had two older half-siblings, Carrie Fisher and Todd Fisher, from her father's marriage to Debbie Reynolds.

Fisher and her sister toured the world with Stevens, attending different schools and having tutors. Fisher graduated from Beverly Hills High School, then attended Emerson College in Boston, as well as the University of Paris for one semester, and, in the summer of 1987, an acting retreat conducted in Italy by coach Sandra Seacat.

She was named Miss Golden Globe at the 1992 Golden Globe Awards.

Career 
Her first movie role was Averil in the comedy Pretty Smart (1987), which starred her sister, Tricia. Joely then played Kris in TV's Schoolbreak Special drama Dedicated to the One I Love (1991) opposite Danielle Ferland. Next came the feature I'll Do Anything (1994) starring Nick Nolte, which helped her career as bigger roles followed. She also had a variety of guest roles on series such as Growing Pains, Blossom, Caroline in the City, The Golden Palace, The Outer Limits, Grace Under Fire and Coach.

In 1994, she was cast as Paige Clark on the sitcom Ellen. She played the role until the series ended in 1998. That same year, she earned a Golden Globe Award nomination for Best Supporting Actress – Series, Miniseries or Television Film. She also sang the theme song "Who has a perfect smile? Who has a comical style, who likes to hang out with her friends, who who? Ellen!" with Clea Lewis. She followed Ellen with the role of Dr. Brenda Bradford in the feature movie Inspector Gadget (1999) opposite Matthew Broderick.

Fisher's Broadway debut was as a replacement in the revival of Grease (1994). She was also a replacement in the revival of Cabaret (1998). Her vocal range is alto.

Joely's career in music not only landed her on Broadway but she was featured in Albums. Her most noted album was "Tradition; a family at Christmas" which she, her mother Connie Stevens all sang various Christmas carols. She sang her own solo "Grown Up Christmas List". Her vocals are also heard singing "One For My Baby" in Harold Arlen's album "STAGE"

From 2003 until 2005, Fisher starred in the Lifetime network's drama series Wild Card as insurance investigator Zoe Busiek. After that, she had a recurring role as Lynette's boss Nina on Desperate Housewives. From 2006 until 2010, Fisher starred opposite actor Brad Garrett as Joy Stark in the Fox TV sitcom 'Til Death.

In 2021, Fisher starred as Irene Cody in the Lifetime film Girl in the Basement which was inspired by the Fritzl case.

Personal life 
Fisher married cinematographer Christopher Duddy in 1996. They have three daughters, two who were born in 2001 and 2006, and a third who was adopted in September 2008. She is also stepmother to Duddy's two sons, Cameron, who is the bass guitarist for the country music band Midland, (born c. 1986) and Collin (born circa 1988). As of at least 2004, the family lives in Los Angeles next to Fisher's sister Tricia, with whom she is close.

In late 2008, she became an artist ambassador for Save the Children. She traveled to Xai-Xai, Mozambique, to visit with children that are part of the child sponsorship programs.

Filmography

Film

Television

Discography
1993: Tradition: A Family at Christmas; she sang 3 songs with her mother Connie Stevens and sister Tricia Leigh Fisher. She has 1 solo: Grown Up Christmas List
1995: S.T.A.G.E. Music of Harold Arlen "One for my Baby"
1998: Lerner, Lowe, Lane and Friends, "Come Back to Me"
2000: Adler, Brock, and Coleman, "Welcome to Holiday Inn"

References

External links 

 
 

1967 births
20th-century American actresses
21st-century American actresses
American film actresses
American people of Irish descent
American people of Italian descent
American people of Russian-Jewish descent
American stage actresses
American television actresses
American voice actresses
Emerson College alumni
Living people
People from Greater Los Angeles
Beverly Hills High School alumni